Taguma Mukomberanwa (born 1978) is a Zimbabwean sculptor.  The son of Nicholas Mukomberanwa, he is the brother of sculptors Anderson, Lawrence, Ennica, and Netsai Mukomberanwa, and the cousin of Nesbert Mukomberanwa. Taguma's work was included in a 2017 exhibition exploring modern art in Africa in at Kunsthalle ConARTz in Markt Indersdorf, Germany.

References

External links
Biography, with images of his work

1978 births
Living people
People from Mashonaland East Province
21st-century Zimbabwean sculptors
20th-century Zimbabwean sculptors